= Xweshkarih i Redagan =

Middle Persian text

Xweshkarih i Redagan (The duty of children) is a Middle Persian text for Zoroastrian children on how to behave accordingly. The work was most likely composed after the Sasanian era (224–651).

== Sources ==
- Moazami, Mahnaz (2000). "Xwēškārīh ī Rēdagān". Encyclopædia Iranica, online edition. New York.
